Hutki may refer to the following places:
Hutki, Lesser Poland Voivodeship (south Poland)
Hutki, Lublin Voivodeship (east Poland)
Hutki, Podlaskie Voivodeship (north-east Poland)
Hutki, Silesian Voivodeship (south Poland)

It may also refer to:
Dried fish, also known as Shutki or Hutki